Bobko, Бобко, Belarusian Бабко is a Slavic surname. Notable people with the surname include:

 Karol J. Bobko (born 1937), American astronaut and test pilot
 Igor Bobko (born 1985), Belarusian footballer
 Ivan Bobko (born 1990), Ukrainian footballer

Slavic-language surnames